High Blues Pressure is an album by trumpeter Freddie Hubbard.  It was his second release on the Atlantic label and features performances by Hubbard, James Spaulding, Bennie Maupin, Herbie Lewis, Roman "Dog" Broadus, Weldon Irvine, Kenny Barron, Freddie Waits, Louis Hayes, Howard Johnson, and Kiane Zawadi.

Track listing
 "Can't Let Her Go" (Weldon Irvine) - 6:13  
 "Latina" - 4:47  
 "High Blues Pressure" - 7:31  
 "A Bientot" (Billy Taylor) 7:37  
 "True Colors" - 5:29  
 "For B.P." - 9:44  
All compositions by Freddie Hubbard except as indicated
Recorded on November 13, 1967 (tracks 1-3) and January 10, 1968 (tracks 4-6)

Personnel
Freddie Hubbard - trumpet, flugelhorn
James Spaulding - alto saxophone, flute
Bennie Maupin - tenor saxophone, flute
Herbie Lewis - bass 
Roman "Dog" Broadus - conga
Weldon Irvine - piano (track 1)
Kenny Barron - piano (tracks 2-6)
Freddie Waits - drums (tracks 1-3)
Louis Hayes - drums (tracks 4-6)
Howard Johnson - baritone saxophone, tuba (tracks 2-6)
Kiane Zawadi - trombone, euphonium (tracks 2-6)

References

1968 albums
Freddie Hubbard albums
Albums produced by Joel Dorn
Atlantic Records albums